Nioro du Sahel, often referred to as simply Nioro, is a town and urban commune in the Kayes Region of western Mali, 241 km from the city of Kayes.  It is located 275 miles (by road) north-west of the Malian capital Bamako. As of 1998, the commune had a population of 60,112, although current estimates are nearer to 69,100 people.

Founded in circa 1240 by a Diawando slave named Beydari Tamboura, Nioro attained its greatest height in the eighteenth century as the then-capital of the Bambara kingdom of Kaarta.  The town became an important trading center between Upper Senegal and the Sudan.

In the early 1850s, the Toucouleur conqueror El Hadj Umar Tall invaded Kaarta, forcing the kingdom's conversion to Islam; he built a great mosque in Nioro  in 1854.

The town has an airstrip at Nioro Airport.

References 

Communes of Kayes Region